The Indian locomotive class WP was a class of 4-6-2 "Pacific" steam locomotives used in India. It was introduced after World War II for passenger duties, marking the change from 'X' to 'W' as the classification code for broad gauge locomotives. The class was designed specifically for low-calorie, high-ash Indian coal, by Railway Board designers in India.

History

A total of 755 WPs were built between 1947 and 1967, bearing fleet numbers 7000 to 7754. The first batch of sixteen, numbers 7200–7215, came from the Baldwin Locomotive Works, USA in 1947, and these were classed WP/P. (P for Prototype).

A main production batch of 300 locomotives followed in 1949, with production split between Baldwin (100), Montreal Locomotive Works (120), and Canadian Locomotive Company (80). The locomotives in this group were numbered 7216–7515, but the running numbers were issued in blocks as the locomotives were issued to the pre-nationalisation companies, and so bore no relation to the manufacturers' serial numbers, or even the manufacturer.

A further 180 locomotives were built between 1955 and 1959, with production split between Canadian Locomotive Company (120), Fabryka Lokomotyw, of Chrzanów, Poland (30), and Lokomotivfabrik Floridsdorf of Vienna, Austria (30).

Between 1963 and 1966, 259 more were built, but these were ordered from Chittaranjan Locomotive Works (CLW), and were manufactured in India, and classified WP/I. The WP/Is were 5 tonnes heavier.

The WP was Indian Railways fastest locomotive in the 1960s and 1970s. Before the widespread introduction of diesel and electric locomotives, several prestigious trains, such as the Taj Express, the Grand Trunk Express, Howrah-Madras Mail, Frontier Mail and the AirConditioned Express were once hauled by WP class locomotives.

The entire WP class remained in service into the 1980s. Seversal WPs weren't withdrawn until the 1990s.

Technical specifications
Boiler:  diameter
Heating surface: 
Maximum train load: 680 tonnes

Class table

Preservation
Nine WP class locomotives have been preserved. Among them, one constructed by Baldwin (7200) in 1947 and another by Fablok in 1959 are a part of the collection of the National Rail Museum, New Delhi.

WP7200 received a full heavy overhaul at Amritsar works in April 2015 and is now kept at Rewari shed near New Delhi for excursion service. Apart from 7200, the remaining eight engines include (7278) constructed by Montreal Locomotive Works and preserved at Charbagh Loco Works, (7581) built by Canadian Locomotive Company is preserved at Sonepur DRM, (7656) built by Chittaranjan Locomotive Works is preserved at Jhansi Institute Railway, (7000) built by Fabryka Lokomotyw or in Charznow Poland is preserved in Bhusaval shed. 

(7411) is preserved in Burdwan and awaiting transfer to the Chennai Museum. The engine is missing its builder's plates, thus its builder is not known, however, records indicating its 1949 allocation to the then still existing Great Indian Peninsula Railway (GIPR) suggest it is a product of one of the North American builders. (7015) built by Fabryka Lokomotyw or Charznow Poland is another Polish preserved WP engine and has been restored to full mainline running order and runs mainline heritage excursion special trains, being  preserved at Rewari shed, (7161) is another locomotive built by Chittaranjan which has been fully restored to full working order on mainline excursions, being preserved at Siliguri. One additional engine is believed to be in existence; however, its details and whereabouts are not known.

See also

Rail transport in India#History
Indian Railways
Locomotives of India
Rail transport in India

References

Notes

Bibliography

External links

Indian steam locomotives
The WP class locomotive
The WP glory
Image of WP pacific in service
Video of preserved WP/P 7200

Baldwin locomotives
CLC locomotives
Chittaranjan Locomotive Works locomotives
Fablok locomotives
Floridsdorf locomotives
MLW locomotives
Railway locomotives introduced in 1947
WP
4-6-2 locomotives
5 ft 6 in gauge locomotives
Passenger locomotives